The Cossee–Arlman mechanism in polymer chemistry is the main pathway for the formation of C–C bonds in the polymerization of alkenes. The mechanism features an intermediate coordination complex that contains both the growing polymer chain and the monomer (alkene).  These ligands combine within the coordination sphere of the metal to form a polymer chain that is elongated by two carbons.

The details of this mechanism can be used to explain the stereoregularity of the polymerisation of alkenes using Ziegler–Natta  or metallocene catalysts.  Stereoregularity is relevant for unsymmetrical alkenes such as propylene. The coordination sphere of the metal ligands sterically influences which end of the propylene attaches to the growing polymer chain and the relative stereochemistry of the methyl groups on the polymer.  The stereoregularity is influenced by the ligands.  For the metallocene catalysts, the cyclopentadienyl ligands (or their surrogates) fulfill this role. For heterogeneous catalysts, the stereoregularity is determined by the surface structure around the active site on the catalyst particle, and can be influenced by additives such as succinates or phthalates, which tend to block specific sites, while leaving others (with different stereoreactivity) to catalyse the polymerization.

References

Publications of historic interest

Polymer chemistry